The 1996 Kent State Golden Flashes football team was an American football team that represented Kent State University in the Mid-American Conference (MAC) during the 1996 NCAA Division I-A football season. In their fourth season under head coach Jim Corrigall, the Golden Flashes compiled a 2–9 record (1–7 against MAC opponents), finished in last place in the MAC, and were outscored by all opponents by a combined total of 492 to 255.

The team's statistical leaders included Astron Whatley with 1,132 rushing yards, Todd Goebbel with 2,419 passing yards, and Eugene Baker with 1,215 receiving yards.

Schedule

Roster

Team players in the NFL

References

Kent State
Kent State Golden Flashes football seasons
Kent State Golden Flashes football